Antonio López Guerrero (born 13 September 1981) is a Spanish former professional footballer who played mainly as a left back.

He spent most of his professional career with Atlético Madrid, appearing in more than 300 official matches and winning four major titles, including two Europa League trophies. Also in La Liga, he played for Osasuna.

López represented Spain at the 2006 World Cup.

Club career

Atlético Madrid
A product of Atlético Madrid's youth system, López was born in Benidorm, Province of Alicante. He first appeared for the first team in 2000–01 whilst the Colchoneros were in the second division, and contributed with 20 matches the following season for a La Liga return, after a two-year hiatus.

Subsequently, López was loaned for two seasons to fellow top division club CA Osasuna, where he missed only five league games combined. During his Navarre spell he scored twice (both of the goals coming in 2002–03), most notably in a 1–0 home success against RCD Espanyol on 15 December 2002.

In his second spell with Atlético, López quickly gained first-choice status. However, during the 2007–08 campaign he lost his position to Mariano Pernía, and would end serving more time at right-back due to injuries to teammates Giourkas Seitaridis and Juan Valera; when selected, he was the side's undisputed captain.

On 15 March 2009, López scored the winner through a rare header as Atlético came from behind 2–2 to beat Villarreal CF at home. After the coach change, with former club player Abel Resino taking over for Javier Aguirre, he was made the starter, but an injury made Pernía finish the season in the starting XI.

Benefitting from a road accident to Pernía in the summer, López played most of the 2009–10 season. On 2 January 2010, again with his head – but in the last minute – he netted against Sevilla FC at home to make it 2–1; on 1 April, he scored in the same fashion, making it 2–1 against Valencia CF at the UEFA Europa League (eventually 2–2), a competition which was won in Hamburg with López playing the entire 120 minutes of the 2–1 win against Fulham and lifting the trophy as captain.

Mallorca
In late May 2012, after 343 official games in ten senior seasons, López was released by Atlético. The following month, he signed for two years with fellow league side RCD Mallorca with an option for a further season.

International career
López made his debut with Spain on 30 March 2005, in a 2006 FIFA World Cup qualifier against Serbia and Montenegro in Belgrade (0–0). During the successful campaign, he scored his first international goal at San Marino on 12 October, hitting home from 25 metres in the first minute of a 6–0 routing.

Supposed to back up Asier del Horno during the final stages, López would not benefit from the former's injury days before the tournament started, as Argentine-born Pernía would be promoted to first-choice. He would only appear against Saudi Arabia in Germany, with Spain being eliminated in the round-of-16.

International goal
Score and result list Spain's goal tally first, score column indicates score after López goal.

Honours
Atlético Madrid
UEFA Europa League: 2009–10, 2011–12
UEFA Super Cup: 2010
UEFA Intertoto Cup: 2007
Segunda División: 2001–02
Copa del Rey: Runner-up 2009–10

References

External links
 
 
 
 
 

1981 births
Living people
People from Benidorm
Sportspeople from the Province of Alicante
Spanish footballers
Footballers from the Valencian Community
Association football defenders
La Liga players
Segunda División players
Segunda División B players
Atlético Madrid B players
Atlético Madrid footballers
CA Osasuna players
RCD Mallorca players
Spain under-21 international footballers
Spain international footballers
2006 FIFA World Cup players
UEFA Europa League winning players